Crag Blazer is the former head coach for men's soccer at DePaul. Under Blazer's guidance, the school made its first NCAA tournament appearance and set a new record for wins in a single season (2007). Blazer's team won the Red Division of the Big East Conference and appeared in the Big East Tournament semifinals. At the time, the team set yet another record: being ranked as high as 17 nationally.

He has been the coach at DePaul since 2001. Before that he was the national team coordinator for the US Soccer Federation from 1993 to 2001. Blazer was also deeply involved with US soccer for the 2000 Sydney Olympics, managing all pre-Olympic soccer events, and working with the team who had their highest finish in Olympic history.

He played college soccer at Xavier University, where he earned a degree in Political Science and Communications, and was the starting goalkeeper from 1987 to 1991. While at Xavier, Blazer was an assistant at La Salle High School; he also coached at Fairfield High School.  He continues to be involved with non-collegiate level soccer, working with the Illinois Olympic Development Program and as the head coach of FC Chicago, a youth soccer team for boys age 6 to 19.

Blazer is married to Claudia and is the father of two sons, Oscar and Juj, and daughters, Stella and Sophia.

References

External links

Living people
DePaul Blue Demons men's soccer coaches
Xavier Musketeers men's soccer players
Association football goalkeepers
Year of birth missing (living people)
American soccer coaches
Association football players not categorized by nationality